M.I. High is a British action television series produced by Kudos for CBBC and created by Keith Brumpton. The series focuses on a team of undercover teenage spies working for a fictional version of the secret intelligence agency MI9 who have to balance their school life with their jobs as secret agents. The line-up of spies has altered between the show's seven series.

The series premiered on 8 January 2007 and originally ended on 21 March 2011 after five series, before being revived for a further two series that were broadcast between 7 January 2013 and 31 March 2014. The show was cancelled in 2015, as the main filming locations of the series no longer existed.

Premise
The series follows the adventures of four secondary school pupils who work as undercover spies. The spies are led by MI9 agent Frank London (Jonny Freeman) whose cover job is a school caretaker. All other spies' covers have been blown, and the only spies left undercover are those still being trained, including those still enrolled in school. To reach their base 230 feet below the school, they slide a light switch across which reveals a fingerprint scanner lock. They enter the caretaker's store room and pull a broom which turns the floor into a high-speed lift which changes the spies' clothing and hairstyles. The identity of the overarching villains The Grand Master (Series 1–5) and The Mastermind (Series 6–7) remains a mystery within the show. The team must constantly save the world from domination by a variety of villains, whilst hiding their spy identities from their teachers and peers, and completing their school work.

Production

Writing
Series producer Kerry Appleyard revealed that the concept for the show came from the creator and writer of the show Keith Brumpton who had the idea it would be fun to do a kids spy show and worked on the concept that kids find it very hard to keep secrets. MI5 and MI6 did not want the production team to use their names in the television programme but did allow them to use the name of the now defunct MI9 which back in World War II was in charge of covert operations in the UK and overseas and created various gadgets.
Producer Kerry Appleyard thought that it was appropriate because the show has a lot of fantastic gadgets.

Casting
Series 1

When the auditions were held for the main characters of M.I. High, leaflets were sent out to schools and over a thousand kids were seen, from which director Toby Haynes had to choose the main characters. When auditions for the part of Daisy Miller took place, there were a hundred children that day to audition. Bel Powley was in the middle of the crowd looking around and she caught Haynes's eye when she was sitting down on the floor and he thought she had confidence, which was exactly what he was looking for.

Rachel Petladwala heard about the audition through the leaflet that was read out in her assembly. She and her friends thought they might as well have a go and when she got the part she was astonished. In the audition for Rose Gupta the actress noticed that " Deoxyribonucleic acid (DNA)" was spelt wrong in the script and informed Haynes, who immediately decided she was right for the role.

The main challenge, according to Haynes, was taking school children and turning them into actors, so they were given acting coaching before filming began.

Series 6

Oscar Jacques was confirmed to be playing Tom Tupper; the actor went to six auditions before he was told by the producer that he got the part. In June 2012, Paul Bamford was announced to be playing student Roly.

Series 7

It was confirmed that two new students would be introduced for the seventh series: Megan McGill was cast as Lady J, and Sandy Bain was cast as Preston.

Filming
Filming for series four and five was confirmed to be located at Selhurst High School in Croydon. The cast of series four Rachel Petladwala, Charlene Osuagwu and Ben Kerfoot reprised their roles. Producer Emma Kingsman-Lloyd said: "Filming at this location was such a success last year that we knew we wanted to return to film series 5."

She also went on to say “The location of the school near to Croydon town centre has meant that we're ideally situated near to shops and banks and it also has a wide variety of locations – parks, streets and cafes ;– nearby so we never have to travel very far to find locations for the scenes we film off site.

“But perhaps best of all, Selhurst School only closed last year and has been well maintained since so it's brilliant."

Cast

Main

Frank London (Saint Hope's / Saint Heart's Caretaker / M.I. High's Supervising Agent, Series 3–7), played by Jonny Freeman. Frank is an MI9 agent working undercover as Saint Heart's School's caretaker. He acts as the father figure to all of his agents, especially Oscar Cole and Zoe. It is revealed at the beginning of Series 6 that Frank used to date MI9's Chief Agent Officer, Stella, and in "The Last Stand", the pair decide they haven't got over each other and share a spontaneous kiss.
Aneisha Jones (Saint Heart's Student and MI9 Spy, Series 6–7), played by Oyiza Momoh. Aniesha is a field agent with Dan and Zoe. She fights KORPS, and is the master of disguise in the group. Series 7 reveals she is also Mrs. King's niece.
Dan Morgan (Saint Heart's Student and MI9 Spy, Series 6–7), played by Sam Strike. Daniel Morgan is a very good field agent with Zoe and Aniesha. He and Zoe are attracted to each other, as shown especially in episodes 9 and 13, Series 6, where he risks his life to save her. Melissa Allbright has a crush on him but he doesn't feel the same as he has feelings for Zoe.
Tom Tupper (Saint Heart's Student and MI9 Spy, Series 6–7) played by Oscar Jacques. Tom is the gadget boy of the group. He usually stays behind at base and guides the others through their missions, eating biscuits. He has a very sarcastic sense of humour. Tom gets jealous at times that he is usually required to stay in the base unlike the others.
Keri Summers (Saint Heart's Student and MI9 Spy, Series 7), played by Julia Brown. Keri is a clone of The Mastermind originally named J:4:5:K:3:R:1, and is effectively Zoe's 'sister'. She becomes an agent in the first episode of Series 7 and replaces Zoe. It is revealed in this episode that she received special treatment by KORPS that makes her ideal as a host of The Mastermind's consciousness, but KORPS threw her out, believing that it was unsuccessful. She, along with another clone, J:6:3:L:1:B:1 (Libi) received the treatment. Libi was found working for KORPS as a scientist, not knowing about her true purpose. She was later placed with a foster family by MI9.

Supporting
Stella Knight (Chief Agent Officer, Series 6–7), played by Rebecca Palmer. She was Chief Agent Officer of MI9 from Series 6 until "The League of Mata Hari", when she was found out to be part of a conspiracy in MI9 (the League of Matahari), Mike Stern claimed it was her idea to kill the Security Minister. She later appears in "We Need to Talk About KORTEX" / "The Last Stand", when it is discovered she was framed by Mike Stern and Hamish, and is later reinstated in MI9.
Hamish Campbell (Ex Head of MI9 Stationery / Head of MI9, KORPS agent, Series 7), played by Finn Den Hertog. When the MI High team are investigating the League of Matahari they find a ten-year-old video of Hamish speaking of his investigation into the League. Before his investigation he was known as one of MI9's best agents. Aneisha even mentions that he managed to outsmart the Russian Embassy using wool from his jumper. After the investigation he was stood down as an agent. The story was that he was permanently affected by a paranoia serum on a mission, tried to get into the League but was turned down and saw conspiracies everywhere (an effect of the serum). This turns out to be false after the MI High team discover the truth about the League. After the League of Matahari was disbanded a new Head of MI9 was needed. After Frank refuses the job, Aneisha puts Hamish forward as he was the only one who stood up to the League from the beginning. He gladly accepts the job and there becomes Chief Agent Officer. In "We Need to Talk About KORTEX" / "The Last Stand" he is revealed to be a KORPS agent and is arrested.
Kenneth Armstrong Flatley (Saint Hopes/Saint Hearts Headmaster, Series 1–7), played by Chris Stanton. He is the Headmaster of Saint Hope's from Series 1–5 and of Saint Hearts from Series 6–7. He is unaware of the spying activities along with much else that happens in the school. He is the only character to appear in all 7 of the series.
Hermione King (Saint Hopes/Saint Hearts Deputy Headmistress, Series 3–5, 7), played by Chanelle Owen. She is the Deputy Headmistress of Saint Hopes from Series 3–5 and of Saint Hearts in Series 7. She is unaware of the spying activities in either school. She often undermines Mr. Flatley and he seems to be afraid of her.
The Mastermind (KORPS Super Villain, Series 6–7), voiced by Brian Cox (Series 6), Gavin Mitchell (Series 7). The Mastermind's consciousness was uploaded into a computer in order to cheat death and various clones were created using his DNA in order to house his consciousness. He only ever appears onscreen as a digital interface in KORPS HQ, or in his neuron containment case. He, his deputy The Crime Minister, and KORPS were thought to have been defeated over ten years ago by MI9, but they survived and rose again in Series 6. The Grand Master was once a KORPS captain, but sold them out to MI9 so that he could run away and assume control of S.K.U.L., an old KORPS division. KORPS attempted to upload his consciousness into one of his clones, Zoe, thinking that she was a successful clone, but failed as she was not a match. He now seeks clones Keri and Libi in order to create two copies of himself, rendering KORPS unbeatable.
The Crime Minister (KORPS Super Villain, Series 6–7), played by Pollyanna McIntosh. The Mastermind's second-in-command. She is incredibly loyal to The Mastermind and was presumed dead after the end of the first war with KORPS. She is generally seen in command of KORPS due to The Mastermind's condition.

Episodes

International broadcasts and syndication

List of broadcasters

 Also broadcasts in Asia on HBO Family.
 In all countries outside the UK all episodes from series 1 and 2 have been edited from 27 minutes to 25 minutes.

Awards and nominations

Merchandise

Books
Books have been released including three novels, a survival handbook and a 2012 annual.

Cancelled novels
There have been three novels planned but were later cancelled.

Comic

DVD release
The first series of M.I. High was scheduled to be released on DVD in two five-episode installments by the Contender Entertainment Group, under license from the BBC. The first of which was released on 21 January 2008 and the second which would complete the first season was to follow on 31 March 2008 but was cancelled indefinitely with no reason given, and the rest of the show has not seen a DVD release yet. The first DVD includes a documentary about the series (which is made up of various short clips shown during the series on CBBC Extra).

iTunes releases
MI High Series 1–3 has released digitally on iTunes Australia, Germany, and France, although across all three countries are only in standard definition, as opposed to the Netflix releases.

Netflix releases
Netflix UK, AUS and NZ made the show available on the platform in high-definition, however it's since been removed.

iPlayer release
The show was removed from iPlayer since its around its last broadcast, sometimes returning some series for short periods of time; however, in late 2020, all series of the programme became available again on BBC iPlayer in high-definition, with the below episode being excluded due their virus outbreak content.
Series 2 Episode 7 - The Cold War
Series 3 Episode 9 - Family Tree
Series 6 Episode 8 - The Germinator

M.I. High games

Whack The Mole!
Starting at the beginning of series two there was a new interactive web experience that could be found at the show's site. The game was created by Xenophile Media. After gaining access to the Flash-based game with a registration process, players could participate in weekly missions. The missions were tied in with events occurring on the show each week, but the game included video clips that summarised each episode which made it possible for people outside of the broadcast area to play the game as well.

The plot of the game centered around the fictional St. Hope's High School which was the basis of the television programme. There was a mole – self-entitled as 'The Mole' – amongst the students, and it was the job of the player to try to figure out who the rogue agent was. At the successful end of each mission, the list of suspects was narrowed down automatically through the process of elimination by using numerous clues that would be discovered about The Mole's identity (e.g. One clue was that The Mole wore a specific kind of voice-changer that would be placed over one's teeth, people with braces can't wear the voice-changer, therefore all suspects that have braces are eliminated).

The user interface included the Digital Operations Research Assistant (D.O.R.A), which guided players to manipulate various technological tools including a geographic locator and an audio analyzer. Players were given instructions about how to use each of the tools in order to successfully pass the missions.

When a player completed the game, they would discover that The Mole was Suspect Number 9: Panda Strobel and that her secret lair was located in the basement of the abandoned Battersea Power Station situated on the south bank of the River Thames.

When the second M.I. High game Catch The Grand Mistress was released, Whack The Mole! was still available for gameplay alongside Catch The Grand Mistress.

As of January 2014, this game is no longer available for game play as it has been removed from the show's website.

Catch The Grand Mistress
For series 4 and 5, Whack The Mole was relaunched to tie in with the new series. The objective was to locate and capture The Grand Mistress, the main antagonist of Series 4, Episode 2, "The Bunny Whisperer" and Series 5, Episode 2, "The B-Team." Each week, missions would be unlocked and information would be released in each mission to allow the player to eliminate possible bases, which would result in the correct base being located by the end of the game through the process of elimination. Various clues about The Grand Mistress' mistress plan were also scattered throughout the game. For the new game, the graphics were modified and updated, but retained the same high-tech look. D.O.R.A. and the SpyPod were also present in the new game.

When a player completed the game, they would discover that her secret lair was located in the Kingsway telephone exchange and that her mistress plan was to build a particle accelerator to create everlasting batteries for her hypnotic children's toy, the Whoozle Top, not to create a black hole underneath London as the agents first thought.

As of January 2014, this game is no longer available for game play as it has been removed from the show's website.

Spy Skills
For the 2013 relaunch of M.I.High, a new game was launched to tie in with the new series. The objective is to complete missions in different areas of intelligence. The games and their corresponding agents are as follows:
Dan: 'Codename: Scramble' (complete missions scaling walls of buildings to escape KORPS agents)
Aneisha: 'Undercover Ops' (use a CAT device to collect items needed by Aneisha to infiltrate KORPS)
Tom: 'Intel. Interception' (use a radial data scanner to decode messages being transmitted by KORPS)
Zoe: 'Surveillance Set-Up' (plant tracking devices near KORPS)

References

External links
 
 M.I. High at Kudos Kudos Film and Television
 

BBC children's television shows
BBC high definition shows
2000s British children's television series
2007 British television series debuts
British action television series
2010s British children's television series
British crime television series
British television series revived after cancellation
2014 British television series endings
Espionage television series
Television series about teenagers
Television series by Endemol
English-language television shows
Television shows set in London